Subodh Srivastava is an Indian costume designer.

Career

Subodh got his first break in the movie Semshook, but his first notable work which reformed his career is director Anees Bazmee's No Problem. Later, he went on to design costumes for films like Thank You, Jaana Pehchana, Chillar Party, Gangs of Wasseypur – Part 1, Gangs of Wasseypur – Part 2, Mastram, Saheb, Biwi Aur Gangster Returns and Jazbaa.

He has an experience of more than ten years in designing and styling for films and commercials. He has worked for commercials of Havells, Dabur Babool, UAE Xchange, Life of Pi Promo for Star Network, Regal Emporia, Emergency Room for National Geographic Channel and Finolex Pipe Advertisement.

Filmography

 Semshook (2010)
 No Problem (2010)
 Thank You (2011 film) (2011)
 Jaana Pehchana (2011)
 Chillar Party (2011)
 Gangs of Wasseypur – Part 1 (2012)
 Gangs of Wasseypur – Part 2 (2012)
 Saheb, Biwi Aur Gangster Returns (2013)
 Mastram (2014)
 Welcome Back (2014)
 Jazbaa (2015)
 Lahoriye (2017)
 Vodka Diaries (2017)
 Super 30 (2019)
 Marshal (2019)
 Rangbaaz (web series)(2019)
 The Final Call (TV series)(2019) 
 The Girl on the Train (film)(2021)
 Noise of Silence (film)(2021)
 Bawri Chhori (film)(2021)

Awards

Subodh got a lot of appreciation for his work in Gangs of Wasseypur – Part 1 and Gangs of Wasseypur – Part 2, as he was the only designer for such a huge and ensemble cast. His work in Gangs of Wasseypur earned him his first nomination in Screen Awards in the category of Best Costume Designer.

References

4. https://www.vervemagazine.in/tag/subodh-srivastava

5. https://www.bollywoodmdb.com/celebrities/filmography/subodh-srivastava/27921

External links
 

Living people
Year of birth missing (living people)